The Knighton Baronetcy, of Carlston in the County of Dorset, was a title in the Baronetage of the United Kingdom. It was created on 1 January 1813 for the physician William Knighton. He was later Private Secretary to the Sovereign to George IV. The title became extinct on the death of the second Baronet in 1885.

Knighton baronets, of Carlston (1813)

Sir William Knighton, 1st Baronet (1776–1836)
Sir William Wellesley Knighton, 2nd Baronet (1811–1885)

References

Extinct baronetcies in the Baronetage of the United Kingdom